(Main list of acronyms)


 V – (s) 5 (in Roman numerals) - Vanadium – Volt

VA 
 VA – (s) Vatican City-State (ISO 3166 digram) – (i) Veterans Affairs (U.S. Department of) – (s) Virginia (postal symbol) –  (i) Various Artists
 VACIS – (a) Vehicle And Container Inspection System
 VACIS – (a) Victorian Ambulance Clinical Information System
 VACUUM - (a) Valid Accurate Consistent Uniform Unified Model
 VANOS – (p) Variable Nockenwelle System
 VAO – (i) Vienna Art Orchestra
 VASIS – (a) Visual Approach Slope Indicator System (aviation)
 VAT – (i) Value-Added Tax – (s) Vatican City-State (ISO 3166 trigram)

VB 
 VB – (i) Victoria Bitter (beer) – Visual Basic
 VBA – (i) Visual Basic for Applications

VC 
 VC – (s) Saint Vincent and the Grenadines (FIPS 10-4 country code; ISO 3166 digram) – (i) Victoria Cross
 VCDS – (i) (Canada) Vice-Chief of the Defence Staff – (i) VAG-COM Diagnostic System
 vCJD – (i) Variant Creutzfeldt–Jakob disease
 VCJCS – (i) Vice Chairman, Joint Chiefs of Staff
 VCNO – (i) (U.S.) Vice Chief of Naval Operations
 VCR – (i) Video cassette recorder
 VCofS – (i) Vice Chief of Staff
 VCT – (s) Saint Vincent and the Grenadines (ISO 3166 trigram)

VD 
 VD – (s) North Vietnam (ISO 3166 digram, obsolete 1977) – (i) Venereal Disease
 VDFS - (i) VisualSVN Distributed File System (VDFS)
 VDMOS – (i/a) Vertical Double-diffused MOS transistor ("vee-dee-moss")
 VDOT – (i/a) Virginia Department of Transportation ("vee-dot")
 VDR – (s) North Vietnam (ISO 3166 trigram, obsolete 1977)

VE 
 ve – (s) Venda language (ISO 639-1 code)
 VE – (s) Venezuela (FIPS 10-4 country code; ISO 3166 digram)
 VEB – (s) Venezuelan bolívar (ISO 4217 currency code)
 VEEGA – (a) Venus Earth Earth Gravity Assist manœuvre
 ven – (s) Venda language (ISO 639-2 code)
 VEN – (s) Venezuela (ISO 3166 trigram)
 VERDI – (i) Vittorio Emanuele Re D'Italia (Victor Emmanuel, King of Italy)
 VERITAS – (a) Very Energetic Radiation Imaging Telescope Array System

VF 
 VFA
 (i) Victorian Football Association (historic Australian rules football league)
 (i) Volatile Fatty Acid
 VfD – (i) Articles for deletion (used in Wikipedia)
 VFL – (i) Victorian Football League, the name of two distinct Australian rules football leagues:
 The original VFL, formed when the original VFA split in 1896, evolved into today's Australian Football League.
 The modern VFL, which operates to this day as a semi-professional developmental league for the AFL, is the successor to the VFA.
 VFM – (i) Value For Money
 VFMO – (i) Very Fast Moving Object (astronomy)
 VFR – (i) Visual Flight Rules
 VFT – (i) Virtual Function Table
 VFW – (i) Veterans of Foreign Wars

VG 
 VG – (s) British Virgin Islands (ISO 3166 digram)
 VGB – (s) British Virgin Islands (ISO 3166 trigram)

VH 
 VH1 – (a/i) Video Hits One
 VHF – (i) Very High Frequency

VI 
 vi – (s) Vietnamese language (ISO 639-1 code)
 VI – (s) 6 (in Roman numerals) –  British Virgin Islands (FIPS 10-4 territory code) – United States Virgin Islands (postal symbol; ISO 3166 digram) – (i) vide infra (Latin, "see below") – Virtual Instrument (LabVIEW)
 VIA – (a) Versatile Interface Adapter
 VIC – (s) Victoria, Australia (postal symbol) – (a) Video Interface Chip – Virginia Intermont College
 VIDS – (i) Visual Information Display System
 vie – (s) Vietnamese language (ISO 639-2 code)
 VII – (s) 7 (in Roman numerals)
 VIII – (s) 8 (in Roman numerals)
 VIN – (i/a) Vehicle Identification Number (ISO 3779)
 VIP – (i) see entry
 VIR – (s) United States Virgin Islands (ISO 3166 trigram) – Virgin Atlantic (ICAO code)
 VIS –  (i) Vavoua International School – Vienna Independent Shorts – Viewable Image Size – Visual Instruction Set
 VISCII – (p) VIetnamese Standard Code for Information Interchange
 VIT – (i) Vellore Institute of Technology
 VIVO – (i) Video In Video Out

VJ 
 VJ – (i) Video Jockey

VK 
 VK – (s) Australia (ham radio code) – (i) Västerbottens-Kuriren, a Swedish daily newspaper

VL 
 VLA – (i) Very Large Array – (UK) Veterinary Laboratories Agency
 VLAD – (a/i) Vertical Line Array DIFAR
 VLBA – (i) Very Long Baseline Array
 VLF – (i) Very Low Frequency
 VLIW – (i) Very Long Instruction Word
 VLPFC – (i) VentroLateral PreFrontal Cortex
 VLPMC – (i) VentroLateral PreMotor Cortex
 VLSF – (i) Very Loud, Stink-Free
 VLSI – (i) Very-large-scale integration
 VLVS – (i) Very Loud, Very Stinky

VM 
 VM – (s) Vietnam (FIPS 10-4 country code)
 VMASC – (i/a) Virginia Modeling Analysis & Simulation Center ("vee-mask")
 VMF – (i) Variable Message Format
 VMF – Marine Fighting Squadron of the United States Marine Corps
 VMN – (p) VentroMedial Nucleus (neurophysiology)

VN 
 VN – (s) Vietnam (ISO 3166 digram)
 VND – (s) Vietnamese đồng (ISO 4217 currency code)
 VNIR – (i) Visible and Near InfraRed
 VNM – (s) Vietnam (ISO 3166 trigram)
 VNS – see entry
 VNV M/C USA – (a) Viet Nam Vet's Motorcycle Club USA

VO 
 VOA – (a) Voice of America
 vo – (s) Volapük language (ISO 639-1 code)
 VOC – (i)  (Dutch East India Company) – Volatile organic compounds
 VOIP – (a) Voice Over Internet Protocol
 vol – (s) Volapük language (ISO 639-2 code)
 VOLT – (a) Visual OpenType Layout Tool
 Volvo – (p) Swedish supplier of commercial vehicles owned by Ford Motor Company. "Volvo" means "I roll" in Latin.
 VON – (i) Victorian Order of Nurses
 VOR – (i) VHF Omnidirectional Ranging
 VOR – (a) Voice of Russia
 VOX – (p) Voice Operated eXchange (Voice-operated oscillator)

VP 
 VP – (a/i) Vice-president ("veep")
 VPN – (i) Virtual private network

VQ 
 VQ – (i) Vector quantization – (s) U.S. Virgin Islands (FIPS 10-4 territory code)

VR 
 VR – (i) Virtual reality
 VROTS – (i)  Victorian rare or threatened species
 VRSG – (i)  Virtual reality scene generator
 V/R - (i)  Very respectfully; standard military closure

VS 
 VS – (i) Very special (brandy grade) – vide supra (Latin, "see above")
 VSAT – (a) Very small aperture terminal ("vee-satt")
 VSHORAD – (p) Very short range air defence
 VSO – (i) Voluntary Services Overseas
 VSOP –  (i) Variations séculaires des orbites planétaires (French, "Planetary Orbit Secular Variations") – Very small outline package (integrated circuit) – Very superior old pale (brandy grade) – VLBI Space Observatory Programme
 VSR – (i) Very special relativity
 V/STOL – (p) Vertical/short take-off and landing ("vee-stoll")

VT 
 VT
 (s) Vatican City-State (FIPS 10-4 country code)
 Vermont (postal symbol)
 (i) Video tape
 Virginia Tech
 VTC – (i) Video Tele-Conference
 VTEC – (i) Variable valve Timing and Electronic lift Control
 VTOL – (i) Vertical Take-Off & Landing

VU 
 VU – (s) Vanuatu (ISO 3166 digram) – (i) Vedanta University
 VUB – (i) Vrije Universiteit Brussel (Belgian university)
 VUK – (a)  Value Up Kit
 VUT – (s) Vanuatu (ISO 3166 trigram)
 VUV – (s) Vanuatu vatu (ISO 4217 currency code)

VV 
 V&V – (i) Verification & Validation
 VV – (i) Via Voice – Village Voice
 VV&A – (i) Verification, Validation & Accreditation
 VVAF – (i) Vietnam Veterans of America Foundation

VW 
 VW – (i) Volkswagen

VZ 
 VZ – (s) Verizon Communications (NYSE code)
 vzw – (i) vereniging zonder winstoogmerk (Dutch "non-profit organisation")

Acronyms V